France and Indonesia established diplomatic relations in 1951. The indirect relationship between France and Indonesia commenced during the early 19th century colonial Dutch East Indies. Since 2011 France and Indonesia have formed a strategic partnership.

France has an embassy in Jakarta while Indonesia has an embassy in Paris. The relations between the two nations are important as both are democratic republics and each holds significant geopolitical influences in its respective region. France is a key member of the European Union, while Indonesia is a core constituent of ASEAN. The diplomatic relations between France and Indonesia are a key element for developing relations between Indonesia and the European Union and between France and the Association of Southeast Asian Nations. Both nations are the member of G-20 major economies.

According to a 2013 BBC World Service Poll, 56% of Indonesians view France's influence positively, with only 14% expressing a negative view. This is one of the most favourable perceptions of France in the Asia-Pacific, only lagging behind more positive views by South Korea and Australia.

History 

The indirect relationship between France and Indonesia commenced during the early 19th century colonial Dutch East Indies. During the Napoleonic Wars, the Netherlands fell to the French Empire, which also seized territorial possessions belonging to the Netherlands in the East Indies. For a short period between 1806 and 1811, Indonesia was subject to French administration.  During the reign of Governor General Herman Willem Daendels (1808–1811), France exercised its political influence in the East Indies through the Dutch Republic. Daendels was Dutch Francophile, and during his reign in Java he built a grand palace known as Het White Huis (The White House) or Het Groote Huis (The Big House), today the Indonesian Ministry of Finance building, that demonstrate French Empire style. He also renamed the Buffelsveld (buffalo field) to Champs de Mars (today Merdeka square). The battle for Java was fought between British and French-Dutch Republics during Anglo-Dutch Java War in 1811.

The French Revolution and its Republic government also inspired the later Indonesian nationalist movement in the early 20th century. The political concept of the Republic of Indonesia was partly influenced by the Republic of France model. Indonesia also adopted the Napoleonic Continental legal system through Dutch intermediary. Indonesian law is often described as a member of the 'civil law' or 'Continental' group of legal systems found in European countries such as France and the Netherlands.

High level visits
Indonesian President Susilo Bambang Yudhoyono visited French counterpart Nicolas Sarkozy in Paris in December 2009. Both nations agreed to form a strategic partnership in 2011. In July 2011, France's Prime Minister François Fillon and his entourage visited Jakarta. At 29 March 2017, French President Francois Hollande made a historic visit to Indonesia.

During the G20 2022 meeting in Bali, French president Emmanuel Macron and Indonesian President Joko "Jokowi" Widodo alongside Indonesian Ministry of Defence Prabowo realized the major military and investment procurement for Indonesia and France.

Economic relations

France has maintained a development cooperation program with Indonesia for many years. For thirty years between 1967 and 2007, France provided aid to Indonesia within the international coordination arrangements established under the Inter-Governmental Group on Indonesia and the Consultative Group on Indonesia (CGI).  During the period (1992-2007) when the CGI was conducting activities, annual meetings of the CGI were often held in Paris.

In 1986, Indonesian French Chamber of Commerce and Industry (IFCCI) was established to develop and foster economic, commercial and financial relations between France and Indonesia. In 2011 the bilateral trade between France and Indonesia amounting to US$2.5 billion, and France is the 13th largest investor in Indonesia. Indonesian imports from France includes aircraft equipment, machine and computer, electronic and precision equipment, chemical, cosmetics and perfume, food, metal and metallurgical products and pharmaceuticals. On the other hand, France imports from Indonesia includes agricultural, silvicultural and fishery products, textiles and footwear. Currently there are about 100 French companies operating in Indonesia. French companies operating in Indonesia among others are Total, Michelin, AXA, Eurocopter, Air France and Carrefour.

Culture 
The objective of French cultural cooperation action is to support Indonesia's development as a new emerging country. Accordingly, it gives priority to research (rural development, aquaculture, volcanology, geophysics, and archaeology), university exchanges, primarily in the fields of technology and biological sciences, vocational training, support for strengthening the rule of law and democratic governance. Which includes legislative technical assistance, fight against terrorism and corruption, decentralization, human rights training. The implementation of quality cultural actions, such as through the "French Springtime" (Le Printemps Français) cultural festival and audiovisual policy.

France also has established Institut Français in Indonesian cities of Jakarta, Bandung, Yogyakarta and Surabaya, a French cultural center with the mission to promote French culture in Indonesia through cultural performances and exhibitions, film and mediatheque.

Language 
The culture-linguistic relations between Indonesian and French were conducted through Dutch, as evident in Indonesian loanwords from French that mainly political or military terms, such as kudeta (from coup d'état), legiun (from légion) and letnan (from lieutenant).

Institut Français Indonesia also offering French course for Indonesian students.

Archaeology 
Based on the expertise of the Advisory Board on Archaeological Research Abroad, the Foreign Affairs Ministry (DGCID) subsidisies the following archaeological missions in Indonesia:
 Borneo: Diachronic study of uses and Rock Art in the caves and rock shelters of East Kalimantan 
 Java 01: A prehistoric site from the upper Pleistocene period 
 Java 02: The first populations on the Indonesian archipelago 
 Tapanuli

Music 
In art and musics, France and Indonesia has mutual cultural ambassador, Anggun an Indonesian French-naturalised singer-songwriter, is popular in both France and Indonesia.

Current issue

Capital punishment 
In 2015, a French citizen Serge Atlaoui, is facing deathrow in Indonesian prison. During the raid on a factory producing ecstasy in Tangerang, in 2005, the Indonesian police busted Atlaoui there. He was subsequently convicted in 2007 for the possession of 138 kilograms of crystal methamphetamine, 290 kg of ketamine and 316 drums of precursor substances. Atlaoui has repeatedly denied the charges; saying that he was installing industrial machinery in what he thought was an acrylics factory.

On 22 April 2015, French President Francois Hollande warned Indonesia that the execution would damage the relations between the two nations. Atlaoui was spared from the execution on 29 April 2015, and currently, his sentence is being postponed. France is strongly opposed to the death penalty in any place and in any context, not only when the life of a French national is at stake. France has been abolitionist since 1981. Diplomatic relations are described as 'normal' despite the Atlaoui case.

Defense Ties 
After France and Australia heated relations with AUKUS debacle, France moves closer with Indonesia for the security of Indo-Pacific Region and also buy 42 Dassault Rafale fighters alongside Scorpene submarine's.

See also 
 Foreign relations of France
 Foreign relations of Indonesia

Notes and references

External links 
 Embassy of France in Indonesia
 Embassy of Indonesia in France
 Institut Français Indonesia
 IFCCI Indonesian French Chamber of Commerce and Industry

 
Bilateral relations of Indonesia
Indonesia